The Kanyakumari-Pune or Jayanti Janata Express is an Express train belonging to Indian Railways that used to run between Kanyakumari and Pune Junction, Pune in India. It was the first and oldest train service from Mumbai to South India. Initially the service was from Victoria terminus Bombay (Mumbai CST) to Cochin Harbour Terminus, later it was extended to Trivandrum,Then to Nagercoil then to Kanyakumari. 

From 2020 onwards, according to zero-based timetable, it runs only till Pune. The train made its first run to Pune on 31 March 2022, after services were halted during the pandemic. The train ran with the Linke Hoffman Busch (LHB) coaches instead of those built by the Integral Coach Factory. 

It operates as train number 16382 from Kanyakumari to Pune and as train number 16381 in the reverse direction.

Traction
As the entire route is now electrified,this train is now hauled end to end by a KYN based WAP-7 in both direction

Service
The 16382 Kanyakumari -Pune Express covers the distance of 2135 kilometres in 47 hours 05 mins (45.35 km/hr) & in 44 hours 30 mins (47.98 km/hr) as 16381 PUNE- Kanyakumari Express.

Routing
The service runs from  via ,Thiruvananthapuram Central,
,

Ottapalam railway station

On the journey to Kanyakumari, the train will have additional stops at Chalakudy, Irinjalakuda, Wadakkanchery and Ottapalam. The trains will not stop in these stations on the return journey. On the return journey to Pune, the train will have additional stops at Tripunithura and Thiruvananthapuram Pettah.

References

External links
 

Transport in Kanyakumari
Transport in Mumbai
Express trains in India
Rail transport in Maharashtra
Rail transport in Karnataka
Rail transport in Andhra Pradesh
Rail transport in Tamil Nadu
Rail transport in Kerala